Gorgonocephalidae is a family of  basket stars. They have characteristic many-branched arms. 

Gorgonocephalidae are the largest ophiuroids (Gorgonocephalus stimpsoni can measure up to 70 cm in arm length with a disk diameter of 14 cm).

Systematics and phylogeny
The family is divided into the following genera:

Fossil record of Gorgonocephalidae dates back to Miocene.

References

 
Echinoderm families
Phrynophiurida